Lucille Dompierre (1899–1968) was a Canadian pianist and arranger. She made only a few recordings, mainly consisting of works by Frédéric Chopin. She also arranged several Canadian songs and folk tunes for piano and solo voice.

Career
Dompierre was a pupil of Berthe Roy and Henri Gagnon. A child prodigy, she began her concert career at the age of five. In 1919 she won the prestigious Prix d'Europe. The award enabled her to continue studies in Paris, which she had begun in 1918, through 1920.

Upon her return to Quebec City in 1920, Dompierre continued her career as a concert pianist; appearing with every numerous important ensembles and at major venues throughout Canada. For many years she was the resident pianist of the Quebec Symphony Orchestra.

References

1899 births
1968 deaths
Canadian classical pianists
Canadian women pianists
20th-century classical pianists
20th-century Canadian pianists
Women classical pianists
20th-century Canadian women musicians
20th-century women pianists